Fellipe Ramos Ignez Bastos (born 1 February 1990) is a Brazilian professional footballer who plays as a centre midfielder for Goiás.

Club career
Fellipe Bastos started his career at Botafogo, one of the famous club from his birthplace. After captaining the Brazil U17 in 2007 FIFA U-17 World Cup, he was offered a change to move to Europe, for Benfica.

Due to FIFA regulations, he could only make his international transfer following his 18th birthday, and could only be signed for a maximum 5-year contract.

He played his first official match on 24 August 2008. He scored his first goal on the last day of the league season, scoring a game winning 35 yard thunderbolt against Belenenses. On 10 February 2010 Servette FC has immediately secured the services of the midfielder from Benfica, the Brazilian comes on loan until end of season in the Swiss Challenge League.

In June 2010, he was loaned to Vasco da Gama along with Éder Luís. In June 2012, the move has made permanent.

On 16 June 2014, Vasco da Gama loaned him to Grêmio until the end of the season in compensation on loan of Kléber.

Career statistics

Honours
Benfica
Taça da Liga: 2008–09

Vasco da Gama
Copa do Brasil: 2011

Corinthians
Campeonato Brasileiro Série A: 2017
Campeonato Paulista: 2017

References

1990 births
Living people
Footballers from Rio de Janeiro (city)
Brazilian footballers
Brazil youth international footballers
Brazilian expatriate footballers
Botafogo de Futebol e Regatas players
S.L. Benfica footballers
C.F. Os Belenenses players
CR Vasco da Gama players
Associação Atlética Ponte Preta players
Grêmio Foot-Ball Porto Alegrense players
Al Ain FC players
Baniyas Club players
Sport Club Corinthians Paulista players
Sport Club do Recife players
Goiás Esporte Clube players
Campeonato Brasileiro Série A players
Campeonato Brasileiro Série B players
Expatriate footballers in the Netherlands
Expatriate footballers in Portugal
Expatriate footballers in Switzerland
Expatriate footballers in the United Arab Emirates
Association football midfielders
UAE Pro League players